Peter Van Houdt (born 4 November 1976) is a Belgian former professional footballer who played as a forward and manager.

Playing career
Van Houdt started his professional career at Sint-Truiden and after playing four years for Roda JC in the Netherlands he spent several years in Germany with Borussia Mönchengladbach and MSV Duisburg. After his stay in Germany he came back to the club where it all started for him, Sint-Truiden.

Coaching career
On 1 March 2010, it was confirmed that Van Houdt would become U17 manager for Jecora Herk and in the following season would become assistant manager for his former youth club Herk Sport under manager Dirk Verjans. After one season, he succeeded Verjans as manager of the club.

On 24 October 2014, Van Houdt left Herk Sport to become the manager of KVK Wellen. That cooperation was terminated by mutual agreement on 12 January 2016. Eleven months later, he became manager of RC Hades. He left the club at the end of the 2018-19 season.

A.S. Verbroedering Geel announced on 12 September 2019, that they had appointed Van Houdt as the club's new manager. In January 2020, due to financial difficulties, Geel announced that the club had released all players and technical staff, including Van Houdt.

Honours
Roda JC
KNVB Cup: 1996–97, 1999–2000

References

External links
 

1976 births
Living people
Sportspeople from Hasselt
Belgian footballers
Footballers from Limburg (Belgium)
Association football forwards
Belgium international footballers
Belgian Pro League players
Challenger Pro League players
Bundesliga players
2. Bundesliga players
Eredivisie players
Sint-Truidense V.V. players
Roda JC Kerkrade players
MSV Duisburg players
Borussia Mönchengladbach players
RFC Liège players
Belgian expatriate footballers
Belgian expatriate sportspeople in the Netherlands
Expatriate footballers in the Netherlands
Belgian expatriate sportspeople in Germany
Expatriate footballers in Germany